The Kree, briefly known as the Ruul, are a fictional scientifically and technologically advanced militaristic alien race appearing in American comic books published by Marvel Comics. They are native to the planet Hala in the Large Magellanic Cloud.

The Kree have appeared throughout the Marvel Cinematic Universe, in the television series Agents of S.H.I.E.L.D. and the films Guardians of the Galaxy and Captain Marvel.

Publication history

The first on-panel appearance of the Kree was in Fantastic Four #65 (August 1967), and they were created by Jack Kirby and Stan Lee. In their first appearance, the Supreme Intelligence sent Ronan to Earth to investigate what happened to a Kree Sentry, who was destroyed by the Fantastic Four in the previous issue.

The Kree made their first major appearances in the first volume of Captain Marvel, who was introduced as a Kree warrior who is sent to Earth to spy on its inhabitants in Marvel Super-Heroes #12. The following issue would also see the debut of the Yon-Rogg and Carol Danvers a Human/Kree hybrid, who is the seventh and current Captain Marvel. Including Supreme Intelligence, Ronan the Accuser and Doctor Minerva, all of them would feature in the original run of Captain Marvel.

The Kree were one of the major factions involved in the 1971's Kree–Skrull War storyline, the event ran in the first volume of the Avengers. The storyline established the war between the Kree and Skrulls, it involves other groups like Avengers, the Inhumans, and the Fantastic Four. It included several plotlines interwoven around the return of Mar-Vell.

They also featured in the first ongoing series of the Inhumans, in which it is established that ancient Kree experimented on ancient humans which resulted in a superpowered offshoot of humanity. The Kree ultimately abandoned their test subjects, and the Inhumans went on to create their own kingdom far away from humanity. The Kree appear in #18–19 of the first Ms. Marvel run. It was also originally planned that Danvers would be artificially impregnated by the Supreme Intelligence.

The conflict between the Kree and Skrull Empire continued in the pages of the third Silver Surfer volume. They returned in the Avengers storyline Operation Galactic Storm, a thematic sequel to Kree–Skrull War, the Kree Empire was at war with the Shi'ar Empire, who were introduced in the Uncanny X-Men. The event introduced the Starforce team.

Biology
True Kree resemble humans almost exactly, with the exception of blue skin, different visual system and "duplicate" of several internal organs. Kree have a higher strength level than that of a human, and require more nitrogen to breathe comfortably. Kree bodies are adapted to environmental characteristics on Hala that are unlike Earth. Hala has higher gravity and a higher concentration of nitrogen in the atmosphere than Earth. Under Earth's lesser gravity, their strength and speed increase. However, they cannot breathe in Earth's atmosphere without using a chemical, "breathing formula", or artificial life-support devices.

The original Kree had blue-colored skin, but a second racial group with pink skin resembling that of human Caucasians emerged over the millennia. The blue-skinned "purebred" Kree have become a small, but powerful, minority. Pink Kree are much more durable than their blue racial brethren.

Some female Kree can physically influence men, and a few can even drain the life force of others. Most are born with this ability, but are required to have it surgically 'corrected' upon adulthood. They must undergo this procedure when they are adults in order to avoid 'frying' their brains. It seems that this procedure is analogous to female genital mutilation and it is also called "psychological mutilation" as witnessed with Una-Rogg.

Just like humans, some Kree also suffer from various diseases such as Blackgorge, Betath's Plague, the Wasting and cancer which they call Blackend.

The Kree were an evolutionarily stagnant race. This was due to a single member of the Kree race attempting to gain control of The Crystal of Ultimate Vision. This unnamed Kree found the crystal, but attempted to use it to become akin to a god, with powers as of those of the Phoenix Force. As punishment, the crystal "genetically froze their evolution in place" allowing the rest of creation to pass them by. In an attempt to further their development, some Kree bred with other species, producing the 'pink-skinned' Kree, who are similar in appearance to Caucasian humans. These pinks (also called 'whites') eventually outnumbered the blue-skin Kree, but were far from accepted amongst their brethren; many pink kree were exiled from the homeworld and put into forced labor camps on barren moons by their blue skinned cousins due to prejudice and racism. The Kree value what they consider to be their genetic purity, to such an extent that reproduction outside of the species is a strict taboo. In the Kree empire, it is a crime for a male non-Kree to impregnate any Kree.

The Kree race has produced individual super-humanoid beings, either through natural mutation, genetic engineering, or cyborg technology, including Captain Mar-Vell, Ronan the Accuser, Ultimus, Shatterax, Korath, and others.

The Supreme Intelligence attempted to jumpstart the evolutionary process of the Kree. Through a series of events discussed below during Operation: Galactic Storm and the Destiny War, it arranged for a large number of its people to be irradiated with a Nega-Bomb (killing 90% of the Kree), and then artificially sped up their evolution by means of an artifact called the Forever Crystal.

This new brand of evolved Kree, called Ruul, have a grayish skin tone and many shoulder-length tentacles atop their heads. Individuals possess the ability to consciously 'will' adaptation of physical form to different environments, affording them controlled metamorphosis, spontaneously developing the ability to breathe underwater, fly, change form or whatever their circumstances require. The females had also lost their ability, since the males now had that ability.

The Inhumans later brought to light a long-held secret about the creation of the Kree. As it turns out, the Kree are in fact of Universal Inhuman stock, the very first of the first of their kind. Unlike a great many races throughout the universe, the Kree were alternated by two races of cosmological abstracts in the likes of the Celestials and the Progenitors, which evolved them from primitives to empire builders. While the Celestials went on to spawn the Kree born Eternals, it was the Progenitors, a race of universal gardeners and cosmic scientists that made their home at the far end of the cosmos within the heart of a lone star, who through the introduction of the Prima Materia which the Progenitors mine and process on their World Farm called The Primagen, were able to force evolve the cro-magnon Kree race into the cosmic conquerors that they are today.

Culture
The Kree are an imperialistic and militaristic society with the only widespread religion being worship of the Supreme Intelligence. A small minority, like the Priests of Pama, practice a pacifist Cotati religion, but this is forbidden (early Captain Marvel stories mentioned an 'idol' called Tam-Borr and a 'fabricated' god named Zo, whom Mar-Vell served between issues 11 and 15). Some are members of the Universal Church of Truth.

The Kree Empire extends throughout nearly a thousand worlds in the northwestern lobe (Earth reference) of the Greater Magellanic Cloud with outposts in other galaxies.

Kree names are usually short, being one or two syllables. Given names are separated from surnames by a hyphen. Examples include Mar-Vell, Yon-Rogg, Una-Rogg, and Zey-Rogg.

Some Kree have been given comic book references as names, such as Mar-Vell (Marvel Comics), Att-Las (Atlas Comics), Dea-Sea (DC Comics), and Star-Lyn (Jim Starlin).

Generally, the offspring of officers of the Kree Imperial Militia are immediately conscripted.

Population
The Kree population was in excess of 30 billion prior to the nega-bomb detonation. The Kree lost an alleged 98% of their population after the nega-bomb detonated. Although the pink-skinned Kree are in the majority, it is the blue-skinned Kree, such as Ronan, who dominate their society.

High population and technological development allow for highly urbanized planets. Most of the surface of Hala, the origin planet of the civilization, is covered by futuristic city-states, and the second capital planet, Kree-lar, is described as "the most heavily populated world of all".

Government
Under the Supreme Intelligence, the Kree Empire was a military dictatorship. Under Clumsy Foulup, the Kree were temporarily a monarchy, and while under Ael-Dan and Dar-Benn they were a military dictatorship.

Leaders of the Kree have included the Supreme Intelligence, Clumsy Foulup, Nenora, Zarek, Ael-Dan and Dar-Ben, Phae-Dor, Tus-Katt, Morag, Ronan the Accuser, and—most recently—Black Bolt of the Inhumans.

The Kree began their empire over a million years ago, within a hundred years of the acquisition of interstellar technology from the Skrulls (at that time, a benevolent people). The Skrulls at the time were attempting to start a galactic empire of their own, this one based on free trade, and they landed on Hala to help the barbaric natives advance to the point where they could join.

Although Hala is the official planet of the Kree's origin, for a time, the planet Kree-Lar in the Turunal system served as the capital of the Kree Empire as well as the seat of the government. The Kree Empire is ruled as a militaristic dictatorship. The permanent ruler was the organic computer-construct called the Supremor (or Supreme Intelligence), an immense computer system to which the preserved brains of the greatest intellects of the Kree race have been linked. Aiding the Supreme Intelligence were a number of imperial administrators on Kree-Lar, who are also governors of each of the member worlds, and a vast standing space militia. They also employ powerful automatons called Sentries whose job it is to keep member worlds under the empire's watchful eye.

The Kree empire is later ruled by Black Bolt and the Inhuman Royal Family who gained power after Ronan the Accuser, ruler of the Kree after the Supreme Intelligence's demise, submitted to him.

Languages 
The Kree language exist in different versions, including at least ancient Imperial Kree and Kreevian.

Money 
The Kree used as currency the kredits, or credits.

Technology 
The Kree Empire extends across a thousand worlds in the northwestern lobe (Earth reference) of the Greater Magellanic Cloud. They are the only race in the galaxy to possess the Omni-Wave Projector technology, a device which can enable communication across hyperspace as well as be used in an offensive capacity as a weapon. They also possess cloaking technology, which they call the 'aura of negativity'.

Kree technology includes advanced warp-drive starships, robotics (such as the Sentries and the Destructoids), bionic and cybernetic (Cy-Mek) technology, advanced genetic engineering, psionic technology (Psyche-Magnitron), advanced energy weaponry (Uni-Beam), cosmic power generation, nuclear/antimatter weapons and even dimensional linking and siphoning devices. Across the myriad of realities further advancements of Prime Marvel Universe Kree Tech. has been made in strides.

Some Kree inventions have been outlawed, such as the organic-destroying robots Null-Trons, corpse revitalizing Mim Units, and the genetic-enhance Psyche-Magnitron.

In ultimate comics, they make use of nanomolecular shapeshifting battle armor with advanced genetic tailoring capabilities which can harness thermonuclear to cosmological force as both weaponry and power source. The multiversal traveler Marvel Boy makes use of similar metamorphic technology powered by whats called Kirby Engineering, mechanical works powered through belief and mental interfacing along with shifting liquid metal or self-replicating nanotech.

Fictional history

Antiquity
Eons ago, beings of massive power known as Progenitors arrived on Hala, and employed on its population a substance known as Prima Materia, which served to evolve this population from their primitive form. The planet would eventually be visited by another race of beings who would also experiment on its population.

A million years ago, a race called the Skrulls came upon Hala. At that time, the Skrulls were a largely peaceful space-faring race, and they set about educating the natives to the point where they could join their trading empire. However, Hala was home to two equally intelligent races, the Kree and the Cotati.

The Skrulls proposed a test which involved taking members of each race to distant planetoids, with supplies for one year, and then returning at the end to judge what each group had created. The Skrulls took the Cotati to a barren moon and then brought the Kree to Earth's moon where they created the Blue Area. While the Cotati created a beautiful garden, the Kree constructed the magnificent Blue City.

The Skrulls returned to judge the accomplishments of the groups and return them all to Hala. Once back on their homeworld, the Kree leader Morag learned that the Skrulls had been impressed by the city, but the other Skrulls were more impressed by the Cotati's success. Enraged, the Kree wiped out the Cotati and then, when the Skrull protested, killed them as well and seized the Skrulls' starship. They then set about deciphering the technology of the starship.

Kree–Skrull War

When acquiring the technology from the Skrulls, the Kree began to spread throughout the Greater Magellanic Cloud. The Kree launched an attack upon the Skrull empire and the peaceful Skrulls were again forced to become war-like.

At the same time, the Cotati on Hala were almost driven to extinction. However, a small handful of pacifist Kree, hid and kept safe a group of Cotati. Eventually, these Kree began worshipping the Cotati that they had kept sheltered. To further hide and keep them safe, the priests relocated the surviving Cotati throughout the universe.

Years later, the Kree, aware that the Skrulls had once created the Cosmic Cube, designed a cybernetic/organic supercomputer called the Supreme Intelligence to help them in creating a Cube. When the computer became functional, it determined that a Cosmic Cube would be too dangerous to construct and refused the Science Council's request.

At the beginning of the War, the Kree established a station on Uranus. Through their work, they discovered that sentient life on Earth had genetic potential invested in it by the Celestials. Intrigued, the Kree began to experiment on Earth's homo sapiens.

Their goal was twofold – to investigate possible ways of circumventing their own evolutionary stagnation, and to create powerful soldiers to use against the Skrulls. However, the Kree abandoned their experiments because the Supreme Intelligence foresaw the experiments leading to the destruction of the Kree. In order to disprove that prophecy, the Intelligence ordered Accuser Huran to murder the scientists responsible for the experiments and summon the Accuser Corps to cleanse the experiments. In its haste, however, the Supreme Intelligence failed to download the full data packet, and five worlds that were seeded escaped the slaughter: Badoon, Centaurians, Dire Wraiths, Kymellians and early humans.

The humans test subjects, eventually dubbed the Inhumans, went on to form a society of their own. Later a surveillance robot, Sentry 459, that was stationed on South Pacific island was eventually awakened by the Fantastic Four and alerted the Kree. This caused Ronan the Accuser to punish those who "murdered" the guard, but the Fantastic Four defeated him.

As the war dragged on, the Supreme Intelligence accrued more political power and responsibility until finally it was elected as absolute ruler of the Kree and came to be worshipped.

The War comes to Earth
The Earth's importance as a strategic beachhead became apparent when the Avengers became involved in the Kree-Skrull hostilities. In the meantime, the Kree were reestablishing cultural ties with the Inhumans.

At this point, the Kree hero, Captain Marvel, revealed to the Avengers that the Kree were planning to 'erase' humanity. This scheme was foiled by Mar-Vell and the Avengers.

As the war escalated and Earth's position became increasingly precarious, the original Avengers were recalled to active service after a Skrull scouting party managed to abduct Mar-Vell, Quicksilver, and Scarlet Witch and also attempted to destroy the Inhumans' Great Refuge, but failed when the Avengers intervened. During the conflict, the Super-Skrull took his prisoners back to the Skrull home-world, leaving the remaining Avengers to pick up the pieces and reform their tattered forces.

The conflict worsened when the Avengers began to understand the scale of the war. They discovered a Skrull fleet wanting to destroy Earth and a Kree fleet wanting to stop them. All sides were determined to either invade or decimate the Earth in order to prevent it falling into the 'wrong' hands. Led by Thor, Iron Man, and The Vision, the Avengers launched an attack on the Skrull flagship, somehow managing to turn back the fleet after a desperate battle.

The war came to a close when the Supreme Intelligence managed to bring Rick Jones into his presence and temporarily altered Rick's DNA to release his 'full evolutionary potential.' Armed with godlike powers, Rick froze both Kree and Skrull forces, allowing the Intelligence to re-establish control over his people and bring the war to a halt.

Further Kree–Skrull Wars
At several points in the years after the end of the first Kree–Skrull war, hostilities were said to have broken out again between the two empires.

The most significant of these instances came when the Skrulls lost their ability to shapeshift, and a Skrull Warlord provoked new hostilities. During this war, the Supreme Intelligence was incapacitated by the Silver Surfer. Afterwards, Nenora, a Skrull spy in the guise of a high ranking Kree official, took command of the Kree empire. The war ended with Nenora's death at the hands of S'ybill, the Skrull Empress. Rulership of the Kree was assumed by an alien named Clumsy Foulup, who was soon assassinated by Kree military officers.

The machinations of Thanos led to the sudden elimination of half the universe's life-forms. Unaware of Thanos' role in the disappearance, the Kree and the Skrull blamed each other and temporarily renewed fighting.

Kree-Shi'ar War

Not long after the conflicts with the Skrull ended, the Kree again found themselves embroiled in a war, this time with the Shi'ar Empire. This war was much shorter, and was engineered by the Skrulls and the Supreme Intelligence.

The Avengers of Earth became involved in the conflict when the Shi'ar opened a wormhole in Earth's solar system to gain rapid access to Kree territory, unconcerned about the damage that would be caused to Earth's Sun as a result. Their involvement inadvertently set off a chain of events which led to a powerful artifact known as Nega-bomb being detonated in Kree space, causing an explosive and radioactive reaction that devastated the Kree empire with ninety percent of the Kree perishing in the process and led to its surrender to the Sh'iar. It was later revealed that the Supreme Intelligence was ultimately responsible for the bomb's detonation as part of an attempt to kick-start the Kree race's genetic development. Appalled by this callous disregard for the life of its people, a group of Avengers executed the living supercomputer. The Kree territory was then annexed by the Sh'iar, with Majestrix Lilandra naming her sister Deathbird as the territory's administrator. Deathbird has since abandoned this post.

Ruul and retcon
Due to the large amount of radiation of the Nega-bomb, the remaining Kree slowly began evolving which was sped up through the machinations of the Supreme Intelligence and the Forever Crystal until they transformed and renamed themselves into a new species: the Ruul. As the Ruul, they resembled grey skin humanoid, with tendrils on the back and side of the head and an overall reptilian appearance. The most notable ability of the Ruul was their ability to evolve their forms spontaneously to suit whatever situation was required. Under the ruse of being a "new" spacefaring species from beyond charted space, the race orchestrated the events of Maximum Security that temporarily turned Earth into a prison. While their plans for Earth was prevented when their Kree origin and behind-the-scenes manipulations were revealed, they were able to launch their fleet in secret and reclaiming Hala and numerous other Kree worlds from their Shi’ar masters and commenced a campaign of aggressive expansion. The machinations of the Supreme Intelligence were undone when a cosmically empowered Genis-Vell, son of Mar-Vell, restored the Kree race to its original form when he destroyed and recreated the universe.

Kree soldiers also appeared during Avengers Disassembled, when they attacked the Earth and were driven off by the Avengers.

Annihilation
In Annihilation #2, it is revealed that many Kree soldiers, commanded by the merchant House of Fiyero, joined the United Front to fight the Annihilation Wave. After mercy killing the Supreme Intelligence and wiping out the House of Fiyero, Ronan the Accuser assumes control of the Kree Empire.

Annihilation: Conquest
During Annihilation: Conquest, the Kree Empire is assimilated by the Phalanx and Ultron, and isolate Kree space from the rest of the universe, but are stopped by the Guardians of the Galaxy, Nova, Warlock, and Warlock's adopted son, Tyro.

Secret Invasion
The Kree have an agent on Earth that learns about the Skrull "Secret Invasion" but he is supposedly killed before he can summon help.

Noh-Varr proclaims the planet under Kree protection and takes part in the final battle. He is deemed a hero by the planet's population and by the Kree that learn of his bravery during the attack. He serves on Osborn's Avengers until he learns of their true nature. While on the run, he manages to communicate with the Supreme Intelligence who grants him the title and position of Protector of Earth and bestows a pair of custom Negabands to him.

War of Kings
Shortly after the Invasion of Earth occurs, the Inhumans begin their personal assault on the Skrull Empire. After destroying a Skrull warship that has fled into Shi'ar Space, as well as three Shi'ar Warbirds, the Inhumans next travel to Kree-lar and claim dominion over the Kree Empire.

Emperor Vulcan, leader of the Shi'ar, declares war against the Kree and launches a surprise attack during the wedding of Ronan and Crystal. The Kree retaliate and through the actions of the various royal family members they endear themselves to the Kree.

After the assassination of former Empress Lilandra, the Kree launch a T-Bomb powered by Black Bolt's voice, intended to end the war swiftly and decisively. Black Bolt is attacked by Vulcan and the two are presumed dead when the bomb explodes in Shi'ar territory. The Kree claim victory and control of the Shi'ar empire.

Realm of Kings
Medusa briefly struggles as sole ruler of the Kree Empire until Black Bolt returned to Attilan shortly after his supposed death. He led the Kree and Inhumans into battle during the War of Four Cities.

Avengers vs X-Men
In "Avengers vs. X-Men," in the wake of the Phoenix Force's advent, making its way towards earth in search for its latest host. Noh-Varr is contacted by the Supreme Intelligence demanding that he capture its power for the Kree Empire. Once after initial failure, earth's mightiest are eventually successful in the acquisition of its essence, however, Protector betrays the team and hands it to the Supremor as per his mission directive.

But then realizing the Kree had no intention of saving Earth from the Phoenix, Noh quickly turns on them and returns the Phoenix essence to the enraged Avengers who leave him behind on Hala as they return to earth. Noh on the other hand is hunted mercilessly for his betrayal. Before they manage to find him, however, he plants a bomb that eviscerates his assailants along with the Supremor's main housing.

A secret group working around the Kree hierarchy through Plex like mind control would later use the power of the cosmic force in conjunction with the M'Kraan Crystal to revitalize the original Captain Mar-Vell. With a now resurrected Kree hero at their command, the Kree designate heroes Carol Danvers and Noh-Varr would soon fall under command of Mar-Vell and the gene-based manipulatory broadcast used to manipulate the Kree into their service. Causing them to turn on the Secret Avengers and order a public execution for some of them as the Phoenix arrives.

As it was later revealed, disgraced descendants of Mar-Vell would act to draw the Phoenix away from Earth and towards Hala in a suicidal attempt to kick-start the races transcendence. This plan failed as the Vision emitted a counter broadcast to said grand nephew's unique telepathic abilities controlling everyone on Hala, as the father committed suicide before killing his own son, The Kree homeworld was spared when Captain Marvel sacrificed his own life and the Phoenix energies sustaining him as the entity came to take it back.

Infinity
During the "Infinity" storyline, Ronan the Accuser and the Supreme Intelligence appear as members of the Galactic Council where they represent the Kree Empire. In the aftermath of the fight with the Builders and the fight against Thanos, the Supreme Intelligence was able to pardon Ronan the Accuser and the Kree Army.

The Black Vortex
During "The Black Vortex" storyline, Ronan the Accuser steals The Black Vortex from the cosmically-powered X-Men, who then rampage on Hala. They eventually leave, but Mister Knife uses the opportunity to steal The Black Vortex and then destroys Hala and the Supreme Intelligence out of petty revenge. Ronan and the Imperial Fleet survive and the last remaining seed of the Supreme Intelligence was stolen from Collector by Star-Lord's half-sister Captain Victoria.

Royals
As the Inhuman royal family, aided by Noh-Varr, make their way to the ruins of Hala in search of the Primagen. They are encountered by the still cosmically empowered Ronan the Accuser, who traps them all in a prison tailored to torment each of its detainees.

Marvel Boy works around it with his own battlefield device. Moving to free the Inhumans with the help of Maximus while soothing the accuser with simulations of a thriving Kree Emperium.

Having helped sow the seeds to reestablish the reformation of the fallen Kree, The Royals depart. Leaving the last accuser to pick up the pieces and hopefully mend itself with the help of the steadily regrowing Plex Intelligence, with Crystal coming along.

Death of the Inhumans
It is revealed that at some point the Supreme Intelligence had sent a Kree contingency away to explore and chart the Universe in order to find purchase and grow the name of Hala throughout the stars. The mission took generations and currently those among the contingency had never seen or set foot on their home planet, only able to dream of it. Eventually they finally returned to Hala, only to find it in ruins. They eliminated Ronan, exiled those loyal to him and decided to use the Inhumans as part of their plans to rebuild Hala and bring a new dawn to the Kree Empire. To that effect, they designed Vox, a new kind of Inhuman which have all the powers of an Inhuman but none of the humanity, initiating in the process a campaign of terror that killed thousands of Inhumans. It was later revealed that the Kree soldiers behind Vox had actually captured Ronan the Accuser and those loyal to him to be experimented on. After breaking free and killing some Kree soldiers, Black Bolt finds where Ronan, now a cyborg, is being held and kills him out of mercy. During the Inhuman Royal Family's final assault on the Kree, Vox sent an army of brainwashed Inhumans to confront Black Bolt as he entered the location responsible for maintaining the Kree's control over the brainwashed Inhumans. Black Bolt was forced to use his powerful voice to wipe out everyone there in order to stop the Kree's plans. Vox and his Kree masters were eventually forced to retreat.

Infinity Countdown
The resurrected Plex Intelligence, now calling itself the Extreme Intelligence sought the acquisition of the Infinity Stones to rebirth its Empire.

Empyre
In the "Road to Empyre," Teddy Altman is made a mysterious offer at the cost of leaving Billy Kaplan. He accepts the offer which was to become the new ruler of the Kree-Skrull Alliance, adopting the mantle of "Dorrek VIII," and beginning the preparations of invading the Earth for "the final war."

General G'iah and her daughters named Alice, Ivy, and Madison obtain a sample of Cotati from a lab while explaining the history of the Kree and the Skrull's feud. At their motel, they are ambushed by a Kree operative. General G'iah leads her daughters track the assailant to a Kree family. After G'iah's daughters prevent her from retaliating against them, the patriarch of the Kree family that blew up their motel room suddenly receives a message on his Kree-tech cellphone by Dorrek VIII stating to all Kree and Skrull soldiers in the field that the Kree and Skrull armadas have united to face a common enemy. They are coming to Earth to destroy them as he speaks. The enemy is eventually revealed to be the Cotati who are returning as well as the Celestial Messiah. In the Kree/Skrull Alliance, Dorekk VIII has gained Captain Glory, Mur-G'nn, Tanalth the Pursuer, and Super-Skrull as his inner circle. When the Avengers learned about the Cotati's true motives, they decided to work together to fight the Cotati and prevent them from eliminating all animal life.

Known Kree
 Aa-Garn – A Kree corporal loyal to Generals Ael-Dan and Dar-Benn during their coup attempted to attack the robotic Silver Surfer, but was killed by General Ael-Dan. 
 Ael-Dan – Blue Kree General. He, along with General Dar-Benn, used a Silver Surfer robot to execute Clumsy Foulup and General Dwi-Zann during the Infinity Gauntlet. He was killed by Deathbird during the Kree-Shi'ar war
 Ahmbra – A Kree who assumed the human identity of Amber Watkins to watch Ultra Girl.
 Ajes’ha – A Kree member of The Chosen Eight of Fate, the guardians of the Lifestone Tree. She originally held the Moonstone that would eventually empower Karla Sofen. 
 Captain Atlas (Att-Lass) – A Kree who is a member of Starforce and ally of Minerva. He was later mutated by Psyche-Magnitron
 Av-Rom – A Kree who is part of a group of Kree seeking to claim Hulkling
 Bar-Konn – A Kree captain who represents the Kree on the Alpha Flight Space Program's Board of governors.
 Bas-For– A Kree lieutenant aboard a Destructoid Battle Cruiser. 
 Bav-Tek – A Kree who is a member of the Kree Resistance Front.
 Bel-Dann – A Kree Colonel who is a member of the Kree Peace Battalion. Colonel Bell-Dann battled Raksor on behalf of the entire Kree empire.
 Bheton – A Kree who is the leader of Ultra-Girl's would-be mentors that resided on Earth.
 Brock – A Kree who is a bodyguard to the Supereme Intelligence.
 Bron-Char – A Kree who is a member of Galen Kor's Lunatic Legion. He smashed Captain America's shield who then defeated him.
 Bronek – The leader of the Kree circa 78000 BC. Bronek was the one who created the Sentries.
 Bun-Dall – Servitor to Supremor
 Chief – Stationed on Drez-Lar under Ko-Rel. Killed by Gamora and the Phalanx
 Ciry – Member of the Lunatic Legion.
 Dandre – A Kree who resided on Earth and is one of Ultra-Girl's would be mentors.
 Dantella – Member of the Kree Resistance Front. Currently deceased.
 Dar-Benn – A Pink Kree General who used a Silver Surfer robot to execute Clumsy Foulup and General Dwi-Zann during the Infinity Gauntlet. Killed by Deathbird during the Kree-Shi'ar war
 Dea-Sea – A Kree who was last seen as a child.
 Devros – A Kree who is also known as the Brood King. Devros was a grand admiral and former commanding officer of Zen-Pram. He was transformed into a Brood and was later killed by Mar-Vell.
 Dimples – A Kree stationed on Drez-Lar under Ko-Rel; killed by Gamora and the Phalanx
 Dwi-Zann – Current leader of the Kree Pursuer Corps
 Tarnok-Kol – A Kree Major in the Kree army
 Ten-Cor – A Kree who worked alongside Peter Quill on Hala until being assimilated by the Phalanx
 Tel-Kar – was recruited to bond to a newborn Symbiote (which would become Venom) and use its shapeshifting ability to act as a double agent to the Skrulls. He got lobotomized by Venom's offspring Sleeper which bonded to him as revenge for what he did Venom and Eddie Brock. He is now used by Sleeper as a body so it can explore the universe.
 Tiptoe – stationed on Drez-Lar under Ko-Rel; killed by Gamora and the Phalanx
 Tir-Zar – served under Yon-Rogg
 Tol-Nokk – assassin
 Tus-Katt – coordinator for the Supreme Intelligence
 Ultimus (Ard-Con) – Kree Eternal; also known as Demon Druid; member of Starforce; buried under Stonehenge 3000 years ago by Tantalus; adopted a new name when he learned of his true origin from the Supreme Intelligence
 Una – medic stationed under Yon-Rogg; was the romantic interest of Mar-Vell; killed by a stray blast during a battle with the Aakon; buried on an asteroid circling Mars
 Una-Rogg – The daughter of Yon-Rogg and former lover of Ronan. She is an enemy of Genis-Vell.
 Uni – part of expedition to conquer Toped
 Underground Militia – Pink-Skinned Kree penal slaves turned fanatical terrorist cell on Earth. Incensed at their own people for ancestral persecution, they eventually turned their rage towards earth after discovering the homeworld's fate in Operation: Galactic Storm. Blaming the superpowered populace of earth for the destruction of the Kree empire, seeking to turn the world against its heroes while priming a Nega Bomb like device to destroy it.
 Nera – white terrorist Kree
 Primus – white Kree; former pawn of the Supreme Intelligence; he led an underground militia
 Tellis – white terrorist Kree
 Star Brand (Va-Sohn) – Kree given the powers of the Star Brand during a White Event in Kree-Pama. 
 Vron-Ikka – a Major in the Kree army; slept with Rick Jones in an attempt to gain the rights to his memoirs; believed they held the secret to his Destiny Power
 William Kevin Wagner – A Kree living as a human; lover of Carol Danvers; blackmailed into staying away from Carol by Sarah Day.
 Wraith (Zak-Del) – A rogue Kree that houses Exolon parasites in his body and the son of the exiled Sim-Del, a brilliant inventor that was banished for his work. After witnessing his parents getting killed by agents members of the Kree, Wraith set out on a quest of vengeance, feeling no particular loyalty to his race or anyone else, but is eventually recruited to help with the war against the Phalanx in the Annihilation: Conquest storyline.
 Yan – A Kree who was killed by the Phalanx
 Yon-Rogg – A Kree colonel who is the father of Zey-Rogg and Una-Rogg; led the Helion in mission to investigate Earth; former superior to Mar-Vell; later opposed him. Absorbed the power of a Psyche-Magnitron and gained abilities similar to Captain Marvel (Carol Danvers).
 Zam-Rel – The son of Ko-Rel (Nova 001)
 Zarek – A Kree Prime Minister
 Zen-Pram – Commander in the Kree army; captured and hatched into a Brood; killed by Mar-Vell
 Zey-Rogg – The son of Yon-Rogg; brother of Una-Rogg; transported to the Microverse by Captain Marvel (Carol Danvers) and wounded by an execution squad intending to assassinate Rick Jones
 Zyro – A technician serving under Yon-Rogg

Hybrids
 Car-Ell/Carol Danvers – Earth superheroine who was born to a Kree mother and human father and raised on Earth. Originally believing herself fully human, the manifestation of her latent Kree abilities was triggered during a battle between Mar-Vell and Yon-Rogg, in which she was caught in the blast of an exploding Psyche-Magnitron. 
 Hulkling (Dorrek VIII/Teddy Altman) – member of the Young Avengers; son of Mar-Vell and Princess Anelle making him half-Kree/half-Skrull; husband of Billy Kaplan (Wiccan); was taken to Earth where he was raised
 Captain Marvel/Photon (Genis-Vell) – former member of the Thunderbolts; genetically engineered son of Mar-Vell and Elysius who was artificially aged to adulthood and imbued with memories of growing up on Titan; Killed by Baron Zemo.
 Knights of the Infinite – A group of Kree/Skrull hybrids who believed in a prophecy about unifying the two empires and becoming their protectors.
 Dorrek Supreme – The group's leader and the first wielder of the "Excelsior" Sword.
 M'ryn – A member of the group who founded the prophecy and father of Mur-G'nn. Killed by the wizard Moridun to be used as body for the latter.
 K'kyy – A female member of the group. She assisted in kidnapping Dorrek VIII for the latter to become king of the new empire.
 Mur-G'nn – A female member of the group. She assisted in kidnapping Dorrek VIII.
 Lan-Zarr – A member of the group. He guided Dorrek VIII through the test to see if he was Dorrek Supreme reincarnated.
 Varra – A female member of the group. She is killed by Moridun who wanted to possess Wiccan.
 Hav-Rogg – The son of Zey-Rogg and grandson of Yon-Rogg
 Quasar (Phyla-Vell) – The genetic daughter of Mar-Vell and Elysius; created in an alternate timeline that was woven into current reality (Earth-616) when Genis led Entropy to remake the universe; developed romance with Moondragon; gained Quantum Bands after taking them from Annihilus. Killed by Thanos.
 Ultra Girl (Suzanna Sherman/Tzu-Zana) – An Earth superheroine who is a former member of the New Warriors; she was a member of the Initiative.
 The child of Vulcan and Deathbird was infused with Kree genes.

Other versions

Guardians of the Galaxy
A member of the villain group Force in the Earth-691 reality goes by the name of Eight-Five.

House of M
In the House of M reality, Genis-Vell is a Kree ambassador who was a guest to the House of Magnus on Genosha.

MC2
The Earth Sentry is a human/Kree hybrid from the MC2 reality.

Ultimate Marvel
The Kree were introduced to the Ultimate Marvel reality by the miniseries Ultimate Secret. The Ultimate Kree are brownish ichthyoid humanoids with green glowing eyes. They breathe an earthlike atmosphere, and their throats are unable to speak English without surgical modification. Ultimate Kree have referred to a Supreme Intelligence, but it has not yet been shown. Some of them worship, or follow the teachings of, a being called Hala, a historic figure comparable to Buddha who preached on the preservation of life while claiming not to be a god.

The Ultimate Captain Marvel (Mahr Vehl) is a Kree spy on Earth, surgically altered to appear human, as well as having an arsenal of defensive cybernetically implanted weapons, and belongs to a family said to have descended from Hala. After deciding to protect Earth, Mahr Vehl comes into conflict with Yahn Rgg and Ro-Nan.

Earth-200080
The reality from which The 18th Diplomatic Gestalt Envoy that crashed on the prime Marvel Universe hailed from. The Reality which Noh-Varr, the dimensional lost hero and rogue of said universe hails from. In his own words and the We Plex unit's historical account, it is a utopian parallel helmed by an intergalactic as well as inter-dimensional spanning Kree Empire. Where travel and interaction with parallel worlds across the quasiverse is par the course for the Kree Diplomatic Gestalt Naval fleet of their continuum.

Hulk: The End
In the one shot Hulk: The End, an alien robot tells an elderly Bruce Banner, the last human on the planet, that the death of the human race was widely celebrated throughout the Universe, so much so that the Skrulls and Kree had settled their differences in celebration.

Ruins
In Ruins, set in a universe where everything went wrong, when a Kree fleet led by Mar-Vell were going to invade Earth, they discovered the body of Silver Surfer, whose Power Cosmic was released negating the ships' cloaking. Then a nuclear assault was launched from Earth towards them, making them crash land on Earth. The surviving Kree were captured by the government and sent to a concentration camp set on nuclear test site, getting cancer and slowly dying.

Thirty years into the future
In an alternate timeline set thirty years into the future, the Kree Empire was united with the Skrull Empire under the rulership of Emperor Dorrek VIII and they were successful in eliminating all life on Earth.

In other media

Television
 The Kree appear in a flashback in the Fantastic Four episode "Inhumans Saga: Beware the Hidden Land". Just like the comics, the Kree were behind the creation of the Inhumans.
 The Kree appear in the 1992 X-Men animated series. They appeared during the Dark Phoenix Saga's last episode when Lilandra consults with two other empires the Kree (who have the Supreme Intelligence representing them) and the Skrull (who have the unnamed Skrull Queen representing them) on Jean Grey's final outcome.
 The Kree appear in the Silver Surfer TV series. In the episode "The Planet of Dr. Moreaux," the Kree enslaved the Silver Surfer and had him work alongside Pip the Troll's kind until they revolted and escaped. In the episode "The Forever War", Adam Warlock is seen fighting the Kree in a space anomaly when the Supreme Intelligence sends the Silver Surfer to get him. If there would have been a second season, an episode called "Rebirth" would have the Silver Surfer trying to stop the Kree-Skrull War.
 The Kree, most notably Ronan the Accuser and the Supreme Intelligence, appear in the Fantastic Four: World's Greatest Heroes episode "Trial by Fire". According to Ronan, the Kree sent robotic sentries which were attacked by Human Torch without provocation. It is then originally implied that they were simply trying to make contact and took offense, with Ronan explaining that they take an attack on their sentries as an attack on the empire. Later, however, Ronan also states that, "The Kree do not make contact. The Kree conquer!" after Johnny is sentenced to death. Still, Johnny later protects a Kree child that is threatened by a robotic lion meant to carry out the sentence. The Kree audience then disagrees with the ruling and the Supreme Intelligence agrees to spare Johnny for the moment, saying that the Fantastic Four may be useful against the Skrulls.
 The Kree appear in The Avengers: Earth's Mightiest Heroes. The featured Kree are Mar-Vell, Yon-Rogg, Ronan the Accuser, Kalum Lo, and the Supreme Intelligence. In the episode "459", they send one of their sentries to defang Earth as it is useful as a strategic outpost in their war with the Skrulls. Thanks to the attack on it by Ant-Man, Wasp, and Carol Danvers however, the Sentry starts to activate a Kree nega-bomb and wipe out humanity. This is prevented by Iron Man, Thor, and Mar-Vell, a captain in the Kree Navy's science division who want to protect humanity (Carol in particular). Afterward Mar-Vell soon leaves to plead Earth's case to the Supreme Intelligence. In the episode "Michael Korvac", it is revealed that the Kree had abducted and experimented on Michael Korvac which ended with Michael Korvac destroying the Kree ship he was aboard. In the episode "Welcome to the Kree Empire", Ronan the Accuser led Yon-Rogg, Mar-Vell, and Kalum Lo to Earth in order to make Earth join the Kree Empire. While Kalum Lo and his soldiers take over Kang the Conqueror's ship Damocles (which has been converted into a S.W.O.R.D. base), Ronan tasks Yon-Rogg and Mar-Vell to Earth to judge the humans to see if Earth is worthy to join the Kree Empire. Kalum Lo had the Kree's alien slave Sydren enter various codes into Damocles' computer in order to get control of the entire ship. Abigail Brand defeats the Kree and frees Sydren from the Kree's control. While the Avengers and Carol Danvers, now Ms. Marvel, have defeated Ronan the Accuser, S.W.O.R.D. takes control of the Kree ship. Ronan and the Kree soldiers involved are remanded to Prison 42. In the episode "Operation Galactic Storm", the Kree attack the S.W.O.R.D. ship Falchion during their plot to open a wormhole near Earth's sun. At the same time, a Kree black-ops team is sent to spring Ronan the Accuser from the Hydro-Base. Captain America, Thor, Iron Man, Wasp, Ms. Marvel, Hawkeye, Vision, Captain Mar-Vell, and Peter Corbeau were able to stop the wormhole device, but ended up sucked towards Kree space. In the episode "Live Kree and Die", the Avengers are separated upon the crash-landing on Hala. Captain America, Wasp, Ms. Marvel, Captain Mar-Vell, and Peter Corbeau are apprehended by the Kree soldiers and brought before the Supreme Intelligence. The Supreme Intelligence then has the humans experimented upon to see what the humans are capable of. When Captain Mar-Vell tries to plead to the Supreme Intelligence to spare them from the experiments, the Supreme Intelligence states that "traitors to the Kree Empire have no say". Thor deals with the Kree soldiers and their Sentries while Iron Man, Black Panther, Hawkeye, and Vision free their captive teammates. After the Avengers and Mar-Vell managed to shut down the Supreme Intelligence for a while, Mar-Vell plans to lead the Kree into a new era of peace.
 The Kree are informally introduced into the Marvel Cinematic Universe through the TV series Agents of S.H.I.E.L.D. In the episode "T.A.H.I.T.I.", S.H.I.E.L.D. agent Phil Coulson discovers a blue-skinned corpse in a secret, underground facility called the Guest House while searching for the source of the regenerative GH-325 serum. Executive producer Jeffrey Bell later confirmed that this was the body of a Kree. In the episode "Yes Men", Coulson asks Sif if she has encountered any blue-colored alien species. The Kree are among the species she lists by name, though she insists they have never visited Earth. In season 2 episodes "...Ye Who Enter Here", "What They Become", and "Who You Really Are", it is revealed that a rogue Kree faction visited Earth as part of their experiments to create genetically altered soldiers. According to Raina, in contrast to others believing they were acting to conquer or destroy humanity, the Kree created the Diviners for the purpose of engineering Inhumans while wiping out those the relics deem unworthy of the process. The episode "Who You Really Are" revealed that these Kree, whose experiments failed on other planets, have been eliminated by the Kree Empire. Having been alerted by a signal, a Kree warrior named Vin-Tak (played by Eddie McClintock) came to Earth to find the remaining Diviners that the rogue Kree faction hid on Earth to ensure the experiments would not resume in the event that the remnants of the rogue Kree faction came to Earth. Running afoul of Coulson's team and Sif, whose memory he temporarily robbed with his truncheon, Vin-Tak learned that Skye was an Inhuman and attempts to kill her. Luckily, Bobbi Morse uses Vin-Tak's truncheon to have himself forget why he came to Earth as Sif escorts him back to Hala. In the episode "Scars", it is shown that Robert Gonzales' faction of S.H.I.E.L.D. has obtained a monolith-like material that the Kree planned to use to destroy the Inhumans. This rock sends anyone who is sucked into it to another planet where an Inhuman being known as Hive was banished to. In the episode "Failed Experiments," it was revealed that the Kree warriors known as Kree Reapers were the ones responsible for abducting the humans for the Inhuman experiments just like they did with the Mayan warrior that became Hive. When the device that was used to make Inhumans was activated by Hive, it attracted the attention of the Kree Reapers where one of them killed Alisha Whitley. Both of them were killed by Hive and Daisy Johnson where the blood of one of them was used in Hive's Inhuman-making projects. Season Five introduced the Kree Kasius (portrayed by Dominic Rains), Sinara (portrayed by Florence Faivre), Hek-Sel (portrayed by Luke Massy) and Kasius' brother Faulnak (portrayed by Samuel Roukin) who exist in the year 2091. The episode "The One Who Will Save Us All" introduces the Kree Taryan (portrayed by Craig Parker) who is the father of Kasius and Faulnak and the Kree's representative on the Confederacy.
 The Kree appear in Hulk and the Agents of S.M.A.S.H. The feature Kree are Ronan the Accuser and the Supreme Intelligence. The Kree are first seen in the two-part episode "Planet Hulk" where the Kree soldiers led by Ronan the Accuser plan to manipulate events that would get Galactus to consume Ego the Living Planet.
 The Kree appear in Guardians of the Galaxy. Known Kree are Ronan the Accuser, Korath the Pursuer, the Supreme Intelligence, Wraith, Phyla-Vel, and Doctor Minerva.
 The Kree appear in the Avengers Assemble episode "Captain Marvel." Their history with Carol Danvers and her becoming Ms. Marvel and later Captain Marvel was still intact. A group of Kree led by Galen-Kor arrived on Earth with a mission to abduct the recently emerged Inhumans and even abduct Captain Marvel as a bonus. They ran afoul of Captain Marvel, Captain America, Falcon, and Thor even when they are tricked onto his disguised ship. After fighting their way past the Kree Sentries, Galen-Kor and the Kree soldiers with him fought the Avengers until they left the ship upon filling it with a dangerous gas that the Kree aren't affected by. When the dangerous gas was filtered out of the ship, Galen-Kor attacked his fighter jet with the other Kree soldiers and the Kree Sentries while having a missile that will launch the dangerous gas the Earth. With help from the other Avengers, Captain Marvel, Captain America, Falcon, and Thor deactivate the missiles, defeat Galen-Kor and his soldiers, and transfer their Inhuman captives to Attilan.

Film
 The Kree are featured in the 2014 film Guardians of the Galaxy. Ronan the Accuser (Lee Pace) and Korath the Pursuer (Djimon Hounsou) are the only notable Kree individuals that appear in the film. The Kree Empire is stated to have just signed a peace treaty with the Nova Corps of Xandar, thereby ending a centuries-long war between the two races. This treaty prompts the radical Ronan to embark on a renegade campaign of genocide against all Xandarians. To the Nova Corps' frustration, the Kree Ambassador (Tomas Arana) tells Irani Rael that the Kree Empire refuses to stop Ronan's killing spree and that his plot is not their concern as they have done enough with the peace treaty.
 The Kree briefly appear in the 2017 film Guardians of the Galaxy Vol 2, where their planet Hala was nearly destroyed by Ego.
 The Kree appear in the 2019 film Captain Marvel. Pace and Hounsou reprise their roles as Ronan and Korath, and are joined by Jude Law as Yon-Rogg, Gemma Chan as Minn-Erva, Algenis Perez Soto as Att-Lass, and Rune Temte as Bron-Char, who are members of the Kree military team Starforce. Mar-Vell and the Supreme Intelligence also appear in the film, both played by Annette Bening. Yon-Rogg came to Earth when the Kree discovered that Mar-Vell was working on a light-speed engine experiment as well as harboring some Skrulls. When Mar-Vell died in a crash with Carol Danvers and Yon-Rogg arrived, Carol shot the engine and got exposed to its energies. After a blood transfusion from Yon-Rogg, Carol's memories were altered and worked under him and the Supreme Intelligence. Carol then arrived back on Earth following an encounter with the Skrulls led by Talos. When it came to a parley with Talos, Carol learned what the Kree did to the Skrulls and their homeworld. After getting the dampener removed from her head, Carol uses her powers to fight the Kree forces which resulted in most of them either being killed or incapacitated. Yon-Rogg was sent back to Hala to relay Carol's message to the Supreme Intelligence.

Video games
 The Kree appear in Marvel: Ultimate Alliance. Concept art for a Kree ship was featured.
 The Kree appear in Marvel: Avengers Alliance.
 The Kree appear in Marvel Strike Force.
 The Kree appear in Guardians of the Galaxy: The Telltale Series. It was stated that the Kree homeworld and those on it at the time were destroyed by Thanos. A group of Kree led by Hala the Accuser planned to obtain the Eternity Forge in order to revive all the Kree and her son.

References

External links
 Marvel Appendix – Una
 Unofficial Chronology to the Marvel Universe
 Marvel Boy Noh-Varr
 
 Kree at Comic Vine
 Kree at Marvel Cinematic Universe Wiki

 
Villains in animated television series
Characters created by Jack Kirby
Characters created by Stan Lee
Fictional humanoids
Large Magellanic Cloud in fiction